The Standard Cross-Cultural Sample (SCCS) is a sample of 186 cultures used by scholars engaged in cross-cultural studies.

Origin
Cross-cultural research entails a particular statistical problem, known as Galton's problem: tests of functional relationships (for example, a test of the hypothesis that societies with pronounced male dominance are more warlike) can be confounded because the samples of cultures are not independent. Traits can be associated not only because they are functionally related, but because they were transmitted together either through cross-cultural borrowing or through descent from a common cultural ancestor. 

George Peter Murdock attempted to tackle Galton's problem by developing a sample of cultures relatively independent from each other—i.e., with relatively weak phylogenetic and cultural diffusion relationships. Murdock began with the twelve hundred or so peoples in his Ethnographic Atlas (Murdock, 1967), dividing them into roughly 200 "sampling provinces" of closely related cultures. Murdock and Douglas R. White chose one particularly well-documented culture from each sampling province to create the SCCS (Murdock and White, 1969). The number of cultures is large and varied enough to provide a sound basis for statistical analysis; the sample includes 186 cultures, ranging from contemporary hunter gatherers (e.g., the Mbuti), to early historic states (e.g., the Romans), to contemporary industrial peoples (e.g., the Russians) .
 
Scholars engaging in statistical cross-cultural analysis are encouraged to use the set of cultures in the SCCS, since each new study adds to the number of coded variables capable of being used with already existing variables. By focusing scholarly attention on this sample of 186 cultures, the data have steadily improved in scope and quality. The open access electronic journal World Cultures, founded by White, published by William Divale, and now edited by J. Patrick Gray, functions as the repository of the SCCS, archiving the now nearly 2000 coded variables and publishing a number of papers on cross-cultural methodology. The journal moved in 2006 to the University of California eScholarship Repository.

Murdock also founded the Human Relations Area Files (HRAF) at Yale University in the 1940s. However, the SCCS contains a different set of cultures, uses a different set of ethnographic sources, and can be considered entirely distinct from the HRAF.

The dataset is available to view on the Database of Places, Language, Culture, and Environment (D-PLACE).

Cultures in the Standard Cross-Cultural Sample

See also
Human Relations Area Files

References

 Divale, William. (2000). Pre-Coded Variables for the Standard Cross-Cultural Sample from World Cultures. Volumes I & II. York College, CUNY, Spring 2000.
 Divale, William, Daria Khaltourina and Andrey Korotayev. (2002). A Corrected Version of the Standard Cross-Cultural Sample Database. World Cultures 13(1): 62–98.
 Hoy, Andrew R. (1994). "The Relationship Between Male Dominance and Militarism: Quantitative Tests of Several Theories." World Cultures. 8(2): 40–57
.
 Murdock, George P. (1967). Ethnographic Atlas: A Summary. Pittsburgh: The University of Pittsburgh Press.
 Murdock, George Peter and Douglas R. White. (1969). "Standard Cross-Cultural Sample." Ethnology. 8(4):329–369.(2006 On-line edition) 
 Naroll, R. (1965). "Galton's problem: The logic of cross cultural analysis." Social Research. 32: 428–51.
 .
 White, Douglas R. (1986) Focused Ethnographic Bibliography for the Standard Cross-Cultural Sample World Cultures 2(1):1–126. (Reprinted 1989 Behavior Science Research 23:1–145 and 2000 by William Divale)
 White, Douglas R. (2007) Standard Cross-Cultural Sample Free Distribution Site (UC Irvine)
 White, Douglas R. and George P. Murdock. (2006). Pinpointing Sheets for the Standard Cross-Cultural Sample

Further reading
Variables in SCCS
Ethnographies used to code variables in SCCS
Resource page for SCCS
SCCS inventory and UC Irvine library citations

External links
Pinpointing specifications for each culture
Public Domain Release 1: Exact Pinpointing for societies SCCS 1–18
Public Domain Release 2: Exact Pinpointing for societies SCCS 19–36
Public Domain Release 3: Exact Pinpointing for societies SCCS 37–59
Public Domain Release 4: Exact Pinpointing for societies SCCS 55–65
Public Domain Release 5: Exact Pinpointing for societies SCCS 66–80
Public Domain Release 6: Exact Pinpointing for societies SCCS 81–113
Public Domain Release 7: Exact Pinpointing for societies SCCS 114–141
Public Domain Release 8: Exact Pinpointing for societies SCCS 142–162
Public Domain Release 9: Exact Pinpointing for societies SCCS 163–186

Anthropology
Cross-cultural studies